Saraswati Mandir High School is located in Mahim, Mumbai, India. The school is part of the Saraswati Mandir Education Society, which was founded in 1950.

References

External links
 Saraswati Mandir Education Society

High schools and secondary schools in Mumbai